Felipe Andrés Ward Edwards (born 14 September 1972) is a Chilean politician and lawyer, militant from Unión Demócrata Independiente (UDI). Since 4 June 2020, he has served as Minister of Housing & Urbanism during the second government of Sebastián Piñera (2018–2022).

Previously, he was Minister of National Assets (2018–2020) during Piñera's second government as well as Minister Secretary General of the Presidency (2019–2020).

References

External links
 

1972 births
Living people
Chilean people
University of the Andes, Chile alumni
21st-century Chilean politicians
Independent Democratic Union politicians